Poca Hollow is a valley in Carter County in the U.S. state of Missouri.

Poca Hollow derives its name from nearby Pocahontas, Arkansas.

References

Valleys of Carter County, Missouri
Valleys of Missouri